Seliran-e Sofla (also Romanized as Selīrān-e Soflá and Salīrān Soflá; also known as Salīrān Pā’īn) is a village in Jahangiri Rural District, in the Central District of Masjed Soleyman County, Khuzestan Province, Iran. At the 2006 census, its population was 44, in 6 families.

References 

Populated places in Masjed Soleyman County